The 1998 Queensland state election was held on 13 June 1998.

By-elections
 On 3 February 1996, Frank Tanti (Liberal) was elected to succeed Ken Davies (Labor), who had been unseated by the Court of Disputed Returns on 8 December 1995, as the member for Mundingburra.
 On 5 October 1996, Paul Lucas (Labor) was elected to succeed Tom Burns (Labor), who resigned on 16 May 1996, as the member for Lytton.
 On 24 May 1997, Linda Lavarch (Labor) was elected to succeed Margaret Woodgate (Labor), who resigned on 17 March 1997, as the member for Kurwongbah.

Retiring Members

Labor
 Len Ardill MLA (Archerfield)
 Clem Campbell MLA (Bundaberg)
 Keith De Lacy MLA (Cairns)
 Wayne Goss MLA (Logan)
 Glen Milliner MLA (Ferny Grove)
 Geoff Smith MLA (Townsville)

National
 Di McCauley MLA (Callide)
 Mark Stoneman MLA (Burdekin)

Legislative Assembly

Sitting members are shown in bold text. Successful candidates are highlighted in the relevant colour. Where there is possible confusion, an asterisk (*) is also used.

See also
 Members of the Queensland Legislative Assembly, 1995–1998
 Members of the Queensland Legislative Assembly, 1998–2001
 1998 Queensland state election

References
Psephos: Adam Carr's Election Archive - Queensland 1998

Candidates for Queensland state elections